Moba is a local government area of Ekiti State, Nigeria. Its headquarters are in the town of Otun.
 
It has an area of 199 km² and a population of 146,496 at the 2006 census.

The postal code of the area is 372.

Notable towns
Moba consists of the following notable towns: 
 Otun Ekiti 
  Igogo Ekiti 
 Ikun Ekiti 
  Osun Ekiti 
  Erinmope Ekiti
  Osan Ekiti 
  Aaye-Oja Ekiti 
  Ikosu Ekiti 
  Isaoye Ekiti 
  Epe Ekiti 
  Iro Ekiti 
  Ira Ekiti 
  Irare Ekiti

Tourism

There are several places of interests in the local government that could attract tourists and they include Ero Dam, Ikun; Oore Monumental Palace, Otun; Eyemojo Grave, Osan; Eegun Regalia Costumes, Ikun; and Egi Hill, Igogo.

There are several co-operative societies in the Local Government and also thriving industries which include Timber/Saw mills and Dairy Farms e.g. Ikun Dairy Farm.

Education

There are 19 public primary schools, 15 private nursery/primary schools, 11 junior secondary schools, 11 senior secondary schools and 8 private secondary schools in the local government area.

Senior Secondary Schools

  Moba Senior Secondary School, Otun Ekiti 
  Erinmope Senior High School, Erinmope Ekiti 
  Igogo Commercial Senior High School, Igogo Ekiti 
Ifelodun compressive high school igogo ekiti
  Saliu adeoti memorial Comp. Senior High School, Otun Ekiti
  Eyemojo Comp. Senior High School, Osan Ekiti 
  Osun Grammar School, Osun Ekiti 
  Amure Senior Grammar School Ikun Ekiti 
  Aaye-Oja Senior High School, Aaye-Oja Ekiti 
  Ikosu Senior High School, Ikosu Ekiti 
  Epe Comp. Senior High School, Epe Ekiti

Private Secondary Schools

  Amazing Grace College, Otun Ekiti 
  Adventist High School, Otun Ekiti 
  Holy Michael Champions College, Otun Ekiti 
  Christ Royal Master College, Otun ekiti 
  AUD Islamic High School, Otun Ekiti 
  St. Andrew Catholic College, Otun Ekiti 
  Ave Maria International Osun Ekiti 
  St. Lumen christi Secondary, Otun Ekiti
  Fullnest sccondary school, Otun Ekiti

Health Care

The public hospitals and health centres in the Local Government Area are:

  B. H. C. Aaye-Oja Ekiti 
  B. H. C. Irare Ekiti 
  B. H. C. Erinmope Ekiti 
  C. H. C. Igogo Ekiti 
  B. H. C. Isaoye Ekiti 
  B. H. C. Ikun Ekiti 
  B. H. C. Ikosu Ekiti 
  B. H. C. Ogo-Oluwa, Ikun Ekiti 
  B. H. C. Osun Ekiti 
  B. H. C. Ira Ekiti 
  B. H. C. Osan Ekiti 
  B. H. C. Epe Ekiti 
  B. H. C. Iro Ekiti 
  Health Post Orisumibare 
  C. H. C. Otun Ekiti 
  General Hospital, Otun Ekiti 
  Model Hospital, Otun Ekiti

The Private hospitals and Medical Centres in Noba Local Government Area are:

  Adebayo Hospital, Otun-Ekiti 
  Ibironke Hospital, Otun-Ekiti 
  Emiloju Hospital, Otun-Ekiti

Notable people 

 Chief Bayo Aina

References

 

Local Government Areas in Ekiti State